Action Boys is a 2008 South Korean documentary film directed by Jung Byung-gil. The film follows a handful of students-turned-graduates of the Seoul Action School as they try to find regular work as film stuntmen, with varying success. Released in South Korea on 28 August 2008, the film made its western debut at the Vancouver International Film Festival on 29 September 2008.

References

External links 
  
 
 
 

2008 films
2008 documentary films
South Korean independent films
South Korean documentary films
Documentary films about the film industry
Documentary films about actors
Films directed by Jeong Byeong-gil
2000s Korean-language films
Documentary films about South Korea
2008 directorial debut films
2008 independent films
2000s South Korean films